AIQ may refer to:

 AggregateIQ, a Canadian political consultancy and technology company
 Aimaq dialect, a dialect of the Persian language (ISO 639-3 code "aiq")
 Thai AirAsia, a low-cost airline of Thailand (ICAO airline code AIQ)